White Colne railway station was located in White Colne, Essex.

References

External links
 White Colne station on navigable 1946 O. S. map
 

Disused railway stations in Essex
Former Colne Valley and Halstead Railway stations
Railway stations in Great Britain opened in 1860
Railway stations in Great Britain closed in 1889
Railway stations in Great Britain opened in 1908
Railway stations in Great Britain closed in 1962
1860 establishments in England